This is a list of notable people from Gandaki Province of Pokhara Lekhnath Metropolitan City. It includes people who were born/raised in, lived in, or spent portions of their lives in Pokhara, or for whom Pokhara is a significant part of their identity. They are also known as Pokhareli People. The list is in alphabetical order.

A

 Ajit Bhandari - Nepalese footballer for Nepal Police Club and the Nepal national team.
 Ali Miya - poet
 Amrit Gurung – (active 1991–after 2013), singer and musician, founder of the band Nepathaya
 Anil Gurung - footballer
 Anup Baral - actor, writer, director
 Anup Kaphle - executive editor of Rest of World.
 Animesh Shahi - reality show contestant and 1st runner up of Himalaya Roadies
 Andrew Briggs - scientist
 Arun Thapa - singer and songwriter

B
 

 Batsyayana - political cartoonist
 Belmaya Nepali - filmmaker
 Bimal Gharti Magar - footballer
 Bishnu Majhi - folk singer and is known as the "Vocal Queen of Nepali folk singer"
 Bishnu Shrestha -  Nepalese Gurkha soldier in the Indian Army
 Bivek Shrestha - singer and leader of Kandara (musical group)
 Buddha Lama - singer and winner of Nepal Idol Season 1

C

 Chandra Gurung - environmentalist.
 Chandra Bahadur Gurung - politician
 Cool Pokhrel - singer and songwriter
 CD Vijaya Adhikari - singer and the winner of first The Voice of Nepal

D
 Dambar Singh Kuwar - track and field athlete for 1988 Summer Olympics
 Dev Gurung - politician.
 Dhana Raj Acharya - politician, businessman and philanthropist.
 Dharmaraj Thapa - folk singer.
 Dharmendra Sewan - singer, songwriter, composer and performer.

G
 Govinda Raj Joshi - politician
 Gyani Shah - is the first Nepalese lady to join Nepal Army
 Gyanu Rana - singer

J
 Jamuna Gurung - entrepreneur.
 Jassita Gurung - actress.
 Jeewan Gurung - singer.
 Jhalak Man Gandarbha - folk singer.
 J. O. M. Roberts - one of the greatest Himalayan mountaineer-explorers of the twentieth century.
 Jagan Timilsina - trail runner, mountaineer and an outdoor instructor.

K

Khagaraj Adhikari - politician,former home minister
 Kamal Thapa - politician
 Karan KC - cricket and is the fastest bowler of Nepal.
 Karna Das is one of the most prominent Nepali singers living and performing today.
 Khadga Jeet Baral Magar - folk singer
 Khaptad Baba - spiritual saint.
 Khimlal Gautam - Nepali Mountaineer and Chief Survey Officer 

 Kul Bahadur KC - Nepali poet, laureate
 Kiran Gurung - politician
 Krishna Bhattachan - Nepal's leading sociologists and indigenous activist.
 Kuber Singh Rana - was the Inspector General of the Nepal Police

L
 Laure - rapper
 Lekhnath Paudyal - poet and writer

M

 Mahabir Pun - teacher, social entrepreneur and an activist
 Marino Curnis - writer and poet
 Mukunda Sharan Upadhyaya - poet

N
 Narayan Gopal - rominent popular singer and composer of Nepali music.
 Narayan Wagle - journalist and novelist
 Neelima Gurung - beauty queen
 Neha Pun murder - murder victim

P
 Palten Gurung - politician
 Prakash Bahadur Gurung - politician
 Parivesh - folk singer
 Pushpa Kamal Dahal Prime Minister of Nepal.

R

 Rabindra Prasad Adhikari - politician
 Raj Ballav Koirala - actor
 Ramjee Kunwar - politician
 Rishma Gurung - actress
 Robin Tamang - singer

S

 Sabindra Shrestha - footballer
 Samikshya Adhikari - singer
 Saraswati Pratikshya - writer
 Sarita Gurung - philanthropist and social worker
 Sarita Tiwari - poet, writer and advocate.
 Saru Bhakta - is a screenwriter of Madan Puraskar, the most prestigious literary honour in Nepal.
 Shesh Ghale - billionaire and businessman 
 Shiva Shrestha - footballer
 Sharada Sharma - writer and poet.
 Siddharth Lama - actor
 Sipora Gurung - volleyball Player
 Sonie Rajbhandari - beauty queen
 Sundar Shrestha - singer
 Surya Bahadur KC - industrialist and a House of Representatives member.
 Sushil KC - footballer

T

 Tul Bahadur Pun - was a Nepalese Gurkha recipient of the Victoria Cross, the highest award for gallantry

U
 Upendra Kant Aryal - is 25th Chief of Nepal Police
 Usha Sherchan singer, lyricist and writer

Y
 Yasin Bhatkal - leader of the proscribed terrorist organisation Indian Mujahideen (IM)

See also
 List of Nepalese people
 List of American Nepalese people
 List of British Nepalese people
 List of Indian Nepalese people
 List of people from Kathmandu

References

Pokhara
 
Lists of Nepalese people